Wakhi (Wakhi: /В̌aхi) is an Indo-European language in the Eastern Iranian branch of the language family spoken today in Wakhan District, Northern Afghanistan and also in Tajikistan, Northern Pakistan and China.

Classification and distribution
Wakhi is one of several languages that belong to the areal Pamir language group. It is believed to be a descendant of the Scytho-Khotanese language that was once spoken in the Kingdom of Khotan.

The Wakhi people are occasionally called Pamiris and Guhjali. It is spoken by the inhabitants of the Wakhan Corridor of Afghanistan, parts of Gilgit-Baltistan (the former NAs) of Pakistan, Gorno-Badakhshan region of Tajikistan and Xinjiang in Western China. The Wakhi use the self-appellation 'X̌ik' (ethnic) and suffix it with 'wor'/'war' to denote their language as 'X̌ik-wor' themselves. The noun 'X̌ik' comes from *waxša-ī̆ka- (an inhabitant of *Waxša- 'Oxus', for Wakhan, in Wakhi 'Wux̌'. There are other equivalents for the name Wakhi (Anglicised) or Wakhani (Arabic and Persian), Vakhantsy (Russian), Gojali/Gojo (Dingrik-wor/Shina), Guyits/Guicho (Burushaski), Wakhigi/Wakhik-war (Kivi-wor/Khow-wor) and Cert (Turki). The language belongs, as yet to be confirmed according to studies and sources, to the southern group of the Pamir languages, in the Iranian group of the Indo-European family (450) of languages, where the Ishkashmi, Shighni/...nani and Wakhi languages are included. A very rough estimate of the population of Wakhis is 58,000 worldwide. The Wakhi live in six countries. In the Gilgit-Baltistan region of Pakistan, the Wakhi people mainly live in Gojal, Ishkoman, Darkut and in Chitral District's Broghol. They also live in some parts of Wakhan in Afghanistan, Gorno-Badakhshan in Tajikistan, the Taxkorgan Tajik Autonomous County in China, Russia and Turkey.

In Afghanistan
In the Wakhan Corridor of Afghanistan, Wakhi is spoken from Putur, near Ishkashim, to the upper reaches of the Wakhan River.

In Tajikistan
In Tajikistan, the Wakhi and other communities that speak one of the Pamir languages refer to themselves as Pamiri or Badakhshani and there has been a movement to separate their identity from that of the majority Persian-speaking Tajiks. Linguists universally refer to Wakhi as an East Iranian language independent of Tajik Persian, but many Tajik nationalists insist that Wakhi and other Pamir languages are actually dialects of Tajik.

In Pakistan
In Gilgit-Baltistan, Wakhi is spoken in the sparsely populated upper portions of five of the northernmost valleys: Hunza, Gojal, Ishkoman, Yasin, Gupis and Yarkhun. The Hunza valley has the largest Wakhi population in Pakistan. The Wakhis of Ishkoman live primarily in the Karambar valley, in the town of Imit and beyond. In Yasin, they live mostly in the vicinity of Darkot and in Yarhkun, they are found in Baroghil and in a few other small villages in the high, upper portion of valley.

In Pakistan, the central organization of the Wakhi is the Wakhi Cultural Association Pakistan (WCA), an organization that is registered with the Government of Pakistan and which works with the collaboration of the Ministry of Culture and Tourism and Lok Virsa Pakistan. The Association is working for the preservation of the Wakhi language and culture, as well as documenting their poetry and music.

Radio Pakistan Gilgit relays the Wakhi radio programme "Sadoyah Boomy Dunyo", the voice of the roof of the world. The Wakhi Cultural Association has arranged more than twenty programmes since 1984, which includes cultural shows, musical nights and large-scale musical festivals with the collaboration of Lok Virsa Pakistan, the Aga Khan Cultural Service Pakistan (AKCSP) and Pakistan television. In 2000, the WCA won a "Best Programme" organizer award in the Silk Road Festival from the President of Pakistan, Pervez Musharraf. A computerized codification of the Wakhi script has been released, which will help to promote the language development programme and documentation of Wakhi poetry, literature and history.

In China

Wakhi is also spoken in the Taxkorgan Tajik Autonomous County, in Xinjiang of China, mainly in the township of Dafdar.

In Russia
There are approximately 6,000 Wakhi in Russia, Most of them have migrated from Tajikistan and Afghanistan.

In Turkey
There are some Wakhi villages in Turkey in the eastern regions, where they have migrated from Afghanistan in 1979 during the Afghan and Russian war.

Orthography
Traditionally, Wakhi was not a written language. Writing systems have been developed for the language using Arabic, Cyrillic and Latin scripts.

Arabic script
This Arabic alphabet is mainly used in Afghanistan and Pakistan:

Cyrillic script
When Wakhi is written in Cyrillic, the sounds are usually represented by these letters:

Latin script
A Latin alphabet, which includes some Cyrillic and Greek letters, was developed in 1984 by Haqiqat Ali:

Sample text
Sample text from a Bible translation published in 2001 is shown below:

Vocabulary
The Wakhi lexicon exhibits significant differences with the other Pamir languages. Gawarjon's comparison of the dialects of Sarikoli and Wakhi spoken in China is reproduced below.

Phonology

Vowels

Consonants

Publications
In Pakistan two books of Wakhi poetry have been published so far using Latin, modified IPA, script.

The first book is a collection of Nazir Ahmad Bulbuls poetry entitled "Beyoz-e-Bulbul". The second book is a collection of old and new poems and folklores compiled by Bulbulik Heritage Center, Gulmit.

See also
 Wakhi people

References

Further reading

External links
 English-Ishkashimi-Zebaki-Wakhi-Yazghulami Vocabulary
 Wakhi poetry

Eastern Iranian languages
Pamir languages
Pamir languages of Afghanistan
Languages of China
Languages of Gilgit-Baltistan
Languages of Tajikistan
Endangered Iranian languages
Wakhan